Live Again, Die Again is a 1974 American made-for-television science fiction thriller film starring Cliff Potts, Walter Pidgeon, Donna Mills, Mike Farrell, Geraldine Page and Vera Miles. It is directed by Richard A. Colla from a teleplay written by Joseph Stefano, based on the novel Come to Mother by David Sale. The film premiered as the ABC Movie of the Week on February 16, 1974.

Plot
A young woman is the first person to be revived from cryogenic suspension, but someone wants to ensure that her resurrection is brief.

Cast
Cliff Potts as Joe Dolan
Walter Pidgeon as Thomas Carmichael
Donna Mills as Caroline Carmichael
Mike Farrell as James Carmichael
Geraldine Page as Mrs. O'Neill
Vera Miles as Marcia Carmichael

Reception

References

External links

1974 television films
1974 films
1970s science fiction thriller films
American science fiction thriller films
ABC Movie of the Week
Films directed by Richard A. Colla
Films with screenplays by Joseph Stefano
American thriller television films
1970s American films